The 1879 Racine College football team represented Racine College during the 1879 college football season. Racine and the University of Michigan inaugurated college football in the Midwest with a match played on May 30, 1879. Michigan won, 1–0.

References

Racine College
College football winless seasons
Racine College football